Sweet Vendetta (foaled in April 2005 in New York) is an American Thoroughbred racehorse. She won four of her first seven outings. The daughter of Stephen Got Even will best be remembered for posting a 1-1/2 length score in the mile and an eighth Grade II $200,000 Black-Eyed Susan Stakes at Pimlico Race Course on May 16, 2008.

Racing career 

Trained by Gary Contessa, she won a score in her second start as a two-year-old in a one-mile maiden special weight race in October 2007 at Belmont Park. Sweet Vendetta then lost her next start to Little Belle who won by two lengths in the $81,600 Busher Stakes for 3-year-old fillies at Aqueduct Racetrack on Sunday, February 24, 2008. Little Belle was timed at 1:44.3 for one and 1/16 mile race on a fast track. Little Belle paid $9.30 to win while Sweet Vendetta returned $8.60 to place. Sweet Vendetta then went on three weeks later to beat Love You Not by four lengths on March 18, 2008 in the $67,500 Andover Way Stakes for 3-year-old fillies in the rain and slop at Aqueduct Racetrack. Jockey Channing Hill was aboard as Sweet Vendetta got her second win in six starts. She ran a mile and seventy yards in 1:42, paying $7.70 to win.

Her connections including pop star owner David Cassidy decided to enter her in the second jewel of America's de facto Filly Triple Crown, the $200,000 Grade II Black-eyed Susan Stakes.

The Black-Eyed Susan Stakes is the distaff counterpart to the Preakness Stakes, and was run on the Friday of Preakness Stakes weekend before a crowd of 28,407 who withstood constant wet weather with intermittent rain. A field of eight three-year-old fillies went to the gate in this one and one eighth mile feature race. Kentucky Oaks fourth-place finisher Bsharpsonata was sent off as the 5-2 favorite over 3-1 second choice Seattle Smooth, winner of the Bay Meadows Oaks last time out. Six to one shot Sherine was allowed an uncontested lead of three lengths through fractions of 23.6, 47.6 with entrymate Pious Ashley in second as the field passed the stands for the first time and worked around the club house turn.

Entering the lane at the top of the stretch, the leaders' strategy both failed as both faded from contention. Shes All Eltish, who settled in fifth early went out wide the whole way around the final turn, then she took over the lead at the 3/16 pole and quickly opened up a three length advantage on 8-1 Sweet Vendetta. Sweet Vendetta had raced back in 6th and 7th down the backstretch but when Jockey Channing Hill asked her for a big run he got it, as she powered by Shes All Eltish at the sixteenth pole and drew off to a 1-1/2 length win in 1:49.6 over the muddy, sealed main track. It was just another length back to late-running Seattle Smooth who finished in third, while favorite Bsharpsonata raced within four lengths of the pace for the first half mile then tired badly late to finish last beaten 23 lengths.

Sweet Vendetta only raced one more time and finished off the board before she was retired in 2008.

Pedigree

References 

2005 racehorse births
Thoroughbred family 16-c
Racehorses bred in New York (state)
Racehorses trained in the United States